The Ramos Acrobats (real name Ramos family) is an English media and television personality family who rose to fame after appearing in the Channel 4 series  Wife Swap in 2009. Before the appearance, members of the family had frequent television appearances. Some of the most notably includes Guinness World Records Smashed and Britain’s Got Talent.

Family Overview

The family consists of husband Marcelo “The Daredevil” de Ramos born (1970) stuntman and Extreme Gymnast originally from Brazil, Wife Anita Grosvenor Ramos born in Liverpool (1974), Acrobat and keep fit instructor. Marcelo and Anita got married in Liverpool in 1995 and have 3 children Jordan Ramos born in Brazil in (1995) Jordan is a former Gymnast for Great Britain, and represented Great Britain in 2 Junior World tumbling Championships. Samuel Ramos born in Sheffield (2003) Samuel at the age of just 6 years old made news for his outstanding Gymnastic Skills and for wanting to join the GB team at the 2012 Olympics despite him being too young to compete. Rio Ramos was born in Sheffield (2010). The Ramos Acrobats have appeared in various reality TV shows, newspapers, and magazines.

Wife Swap controversy
The Family was featured on Wife Swap The Ramos' and the Griffiths  and made headlines when stuntman acrobat Marcelo allowed his TV 'partner' classroom assistant Julie Griffiths to sleep in their marital bed. Acrobat and keep fit instructor Anita Ramos was furious because she'd discussed sleeping arrangements with her husband Marcelo who had promised Anita that Julie would sleep in the spare room. Anita assumed that her husband Marcelo was sleeping in the bed with Julie Griffiths.  Anita moved in with Julie's salesman husband David, 42, in Worcester while Julie went to Anita's home in Sheffield. Anita, who regularly performs in acrobatic shows with her husband, found out that Julie had been in her bed after seeing a preview of the program and identifying the room she was sleeping in. A Wife Swap source insisted that Marcelo didn't sleep alongside Julie but went to bed every night in a separate room.

References

External links
The Ramos Acrobats The Ramos's official website.
The Ramos Acrobats on G+  The Ramos Acrobats google plus.
Jordan Ramos  Jordan Ramos's official website.

Acrobats
Television people from Liverpool